Where the Humans Eat is the first full-length album released by American singer-songwriter Willy Mason. It was recorded in Catskill, New York in early May 2004. Songs were mostly recorded live, and feature Mason singing and playing guitar (adding cello, accordion, and vibraphone in the studio), and his younger brother Sam on drums. Mason wanted to capture the atmosphere of a live performance in the recordings, and tried to avoid re-recording songs: “I made a rule that we couldn’t record any of the songs in more than three takes. It allows you to make mistakes and accept those mistakes. Listening back, sometimes the wrong notes are the best parts of the song, the imperfections are what keeps it spontaneous and live-feeling."

The album's two singles, "Oxygen" and "So Long", charted on the UK Singles Chart, and the album reached No. 38 on the UK Albums Chart in 2005. The song "Oxygen" was covered by the operatic soprano Renée Fleming on her 2010 album Dark Hope.

This album is the second release of Team Love Records.

Track listing 
 Gotta Keep Movin'
 All You Can Do
 Still a Fly
 Where the Humans Eat
 Fear No Pain
 Hard Hand to Hold
 Letter No. 1
 Sold My Soul
 Our Town
 So Long
 Oxygen
 21st Century Boy

References

2004 debut albums
Willy Mason albums
Team Love Records albums